Kashii (香椎) is an area of Fukuoka City, Japan. It is located in the eastern ward of Higashi-ku. Island city, a controversial new development, is located near here. Kashii JR station is on the Kagoshima Main Line of Kyushu Railway Company (JR Kyushu), and the Kashii Line also connects here. See also Nishitetsu Kashii Station.

See also
Chihaya Station for Kashiihama

References 
See Japanese Wikipedia

Kashii